Abbas Mohammadi (born August 23, 1975) is a retired Iranian football goalkeeper who mostly played at Iran's Premier Football League.

Club career
Abbas Mohammadi played for Mes Kerman F.C. before moving to Sepahan F.C. in 2007. With Sepahan he was able to play in the AFC Champions League and his ability and effort was the reason Sepahan made it to Final match before losing to Urawa Red Diamonds. Mohammadi was also able to play in the 2007 FIFA Club World Cup with Sepahan and was again one of their top players.

Club career statistics

International career
He made his debut for Iran in a friendly match against Costa Rica on January 30, 2008.

References

Iranian footballers
Association football goalkeepers
Sepahan S.C. footballers
Tractor S.C. players
1975 births
Bargh Shiraz players
Living people
Sanat Mes Kerman F.C. players
Persian Gulf Pro League players
Azadegan League players
People from Kerman